These are episodes from Season 1-7 of Supa Strikas, a series about an Indo-African football team.

Season 1 (2010)

Season 2 (2011)

Season 3 (2012)

Season 4 (2013)

Season 5 (2014-15)

Season 6 (2019)

Season 7 (2020)

Episode list using the default LineColor
Lists of animated television series episodes
Lists of Malaysian animated television series episodes